Arruda dos Vinhos is a municipality in the Lisbon District in Portugal.

The present Mayor is André Filipe dos Santos Rijo, elected from the Socialist Party.

Parishes
Administratively, the municipality is divided into 4 civil parishes (freguesias):
 Arranhó
 Arruda dos Vinhos
 Cardosas
 Santiago dos Velhos

Places of interest
In 1809-10 several forts were constructed in the municipality as part of the Lines of Torres Vedras, which were defensive lines to protect the Portuguese capital Lisbon from invasion by the French during the Peninsular War (1807–14) or, in the event of defeat, to safely embark the British Army led by the Duke of Wellington. Two of the hilltop forts, the Fort of Carvalha and the Fort of Cego, were recently restored and can be visited.

Notable people 
 Irene Lisboa (1892 in Quinta da Murzinheira – 1958) a Portuguese novelist, short story writer, poet, essayist and educational writer
 Marco Baixinho (born 1989 in Arruda dos Vinhos) a Portuguese footballer with over 330 club caps

See also
Arruda DOC, a wine designation.

References

External links

 Town Hall official website
 Arruda dos Vinhos' wine cellar
 Partido Socialista - Arruda dos Vinhos
 Schools:Externato João Alberto Faria Students
 History of Arruda dos Vinhos, people, links
 History of Arruda dos Vinhos, people, links
 Arrudense: Outdoor Activities, trekking
 Andre Rijo: Candidato do Partido Socialista à Câmara Municipal de Arruda dos Vinhos

Towns in Portugal
Populated places in Lisbon District
Municipalities of Lisbon District
Year of establishment missing